This is a list of lighthouses in Montserrat.

Lighthouses

See also
 Lists of lighthouses and lightvessels

References

External links
 

Montserrat
Montserrat-related lists
Lighthouses
Lighthouses